The Steel City is a common nickname for many cities that were once known for their production of large amounts of steel.  With industrial production also in developing countries, like those in Eastern Europe and Asia, most of these cities do not produce as much steel as they used to.  It is possible there will be new steel cities in those developing countries.

Sheffield, United Kingdom; Birmingham, Alabama, United States; South Yorkshire, United Kingdom; Pittsburgh, Pennsylvania, United States; Gary, Indiana, United States; Lorain, Ohio, United States; Pueblo, Colorado, United States; Newcastle, New South Wales, Australia; Hamilton, Ontario, Canada; Salem,Jamshedpur, Rourkela,Bokaro Steel City and Bhilai, India are some of the cities most commonly referred to with this name, in their respective countries.

List

 Jesenice, Slovenia
 Anshan, China
 Bethlehem, Pennsylvania, United States
 Bhilai, India
 Birmingham, Alabama, United States
 Bokaro Steel City, India
 Buffalo, New York, United States
 Cherepovets, Russia
 Chhindwara, India
 Chorzów, Poland
 Cleveland, Ohio,  United States
 Detroit, United States
 Duisburg, Germany
 Gary, Indiana, United States
 Gwangyang, South Korea
 Hamilton, Ontario, Canada
 Jalna, Maharashtra, India
 Jamshedpur, India
 Joda, India
 Johnstown, Pennsylvania, United States
 Kalinganagar, India
 Katowice, Poland
 Kitakyushu, Japan
 Košice, Slovakia
 Linz, Austria
 Lipetsk, Russia
 Lorain, Ohio, United States
 Magnitogorsk, Russia
 Middlesbrough, England
 Middletown, Ohio, United States
 Miskolc, Hungary
 Muroran, Japan
 Neuves-Maisons, France
 Newcastle, New South Wales, Australia
 Novokuznetsk, Russia
 Ostrava, Czech Republic
 Pittsburgh, United States
 Pohang, South Korea
 Port Talbot, Wales
 Pueblo, Colorado, United States
 Rourkela, India
 Salem, Tamil Nadu, India
 Sault Ste. Marie, Ontario, Canada
 Sheffield, England
 Tangshan, China
 Vijayanagara, India
 Visakhapatnam, India
 Völklingen, Germany
 Volta Redonda, Brazil
 Wollongong, New South Wales, Australia
 Wuhan, China
 Youngstown, Ohio, United States
 Zenica, Bosnia and Herzegovina

Gallery

References 

Steel industry
Iron mining
Development economics
Popular culture studies